Pillai Nila is a 2012-2014 Tamil-language soap opera that  aired on Sun TV. The show premiered on 23 April 2012. It aired Monday through Saturday at 5:30PM IST. The show starring by Shamitha Shreekumar, Divya Padmini, Shyam Ganesh, Shreekumar, Neha Menon and Shanthi Williams.

The show was produced by Saregama and directed by V. Sadhashivam, with screenplay by A. Jawahar. Pillai Nila is the fight between two good friends, Hema and Kokila, for Baby Nila. The show last aired 4 October 2014 and ended with 679 episodes..The show was re-telecastied from 24 October 2022  at 10:00AM (Indian Standard Time)..

Plot
Kokila (Shamitha) and Hema (Divya Padmini) are best friends who are thick as thieves. Unfortunately they break up due to their love over Nila(Neha). Though this is the main line of story, a number of minor characters and stories associated with Nila are intermingled in the series. Nila stays with Kokila and Ramkumar and loves them like her parents and the couple reciprocates it. Suspicion creeps in the mind of Nila when she overhears the conversation between Sharadha and Ramkumar. Nila mistakenly accuses Ramkumar guilty of an affair with Sharada and being the father of Hari, who is actually her nephew.

Cast

Main cast

 Baby Neha as Nila, Kokila's and Santosh's biological daughter, Hema's adopted daughter/Angel
 Shamitha Shreekumar as Kokila, Nila's biological mother 
 Divya Padmini as Hema, Kokila's friend and Nila's adopted mother/aunt
 Shyam Ganesh as Ram Kumar, Kokila's husband/Nila's adopted father
 Shreekumar as Sekhar, Hema's husband and Nila's adopted father/uncle

Additional cast

 Master Sanjith as Nithin (Kutty/Shiva/Arun) as Hema and Sekhar's son/Kudikkulam Kumaran
 Master Abi Dilip as Elango/Michael
 Raaghav as Santhosh, Kokila's ex-lover, Hema's brother & Nila's biological father
 Sabitha Anand as Ramkumar's biological mother
 Shanthi Williams as Savithri, Kokila and Thangadurai's   aunt
 Rajyalakshmi as Neelaveni, Ram Kumar's step mother 
 Ramji as Mahesh
 Murali Kumar as Raja
 Nalini as Kalyani, Sekhar's sister
 Vietnam Veedu Sundaram as Neelaveni's uncle
 OAK Sundar as Thangadurai, Kokila's brother
 Rajashekar as Hema's and Santosh's father
 Vijay Krishnaraj as Sekhar's brother-in-law
 Sheela as a doctor
 J. Lalitha as Nancy, Home caretaker
 Rajini Ravi as Rajini Ravi
 S. Palaniappan (Lollu Sabha Palani) as Guruvaiyar/Govindhan
 Azhagu as Sengodan (Kattu Thatha)/Thilothamma's father
 Kathadi Ramamurthy as temple priest
 Prema Priya as Govindhan's wife
 Jayasundari/Sangeetha Balan as Panchavarnam "Varnam"
 Sindhu as Elango's mother/Hema's house owner
 Rekha Suresh as Thangadurai's wife
 Surindhar as Sathish
 Gayathri as Raji, Sathish's wife
 Baboos as Kada Ravi
 K. R. Rangamma as Rangamma
 Devi Krupa as Thara
 V. Vishwanath as Vinod
 R. Narasimman
 G. Sumathi as Gowri
 Jayakumar as a police inspector
 Tamil Selvi as Selvi
 B. Jayalakshmi as Thilothamma
 Nivarshini Divya as Chandhini
 Kicha as a worker at Thangadurai's guesthouse
 Gowthami Vembunathan as Kanaga

See also
 List of programs broadcast by Sun TV

References

External links
 Official Website 
 Sun TV on YouTube
 Sun TV Network 
 Sun Group 

Sun TV original programming
2010s Tamil-language television series
2012 Tamil-language television series debuts
Tamil-language television shows
2014 Tamil-language television series endings